FC Uralelektromed Verkhnyaya Pyshma was a Russian football team from Verkhnyaya Pyshma. It played professionally in 1989 and 1993. Their best result was 16th place in the Zone 6 of the Russian Second Division in 1993. In 1994 it was converted to the reserves team of FC Uralmash Yekaterinburg called FC Uralmash-d Yekaterinburg.

Team name history
 1989: FC MTsOP-Metallurg Sverdlovsk (based in Sverdlovsk, now Yekaterinburg)
 1990–1991: FC Metallurg Verkhnyaya Pyshma
 1992: FC MTsOP-Metallurg Verkhnyaya Pyshma
 1993: FC Uralelektromed Verkhnyaya Pyshma

External links
  Team history at KLISF

Association football clubs established in 1989
Association football clubs disestablished in 1994
Defunct football clubs in Russia
Sport in Yekaterinburg
Sport in Sverdlovsk Oblast
1989 establishments in Russia
1994 disestablishments in Russia

ru:Урал-2 (футбольный клуб)